Pogonopus may refer to:
 Pogonopus (beetle), a genus of beetles in the family Cetoniidae
 Pogonopus (plant), a genus of plants in the family Rubiaceae